Bodovce is a village and municipality in Sabinov District in the Prešov Region of northeastern Slovakia.

History
The village was first mentioned in historical records in 1427.

Geography
The municipality lies at an altitude of 450 metres and covers an area of  (2020-06-30/-07-01). It has a population of about 325 people.

Genealogical resources

The records for genealogical research are available at the state archive "Statny Archiv in Presov, Slovakia"

 Greek Catholic church records (births/marriages/deaths): 1861-1895 (parish B)

See also
 List of municipalities and towns in Slovakia

References

External links
https://web.archive.org/web/20071116010355/http://www.statistics.sk/mosmis/eng/run.html
Surnames of living people in Bodovce

Villages and municipalities in Sabinov District
Šariš